Henry James Potts (23 January 1925 – 23 April 2011) was an English first-class cricketer and footballer.

Potts was born at Carlisle in January 1925. After attending Stand Grammar School in Manchester he went up to Keble College, Oxford. 

While studying at Oxford, Potts played first-class cricket for Oxford University in 1949 and 1950, making nine appearances. He made his highest score of 50 batting at No. 7 in Oxford's victory over Leicestershire in 1950. In Oxford's victory over Middlesex in 1949 he opened the batting, scoring 47 and 49 in first-wicket partnerships of 90 and 104 with Murray Hofmeyr.

Potts was also an association football winger, appearing for Oxford University and gaining a blue. After he graduated from Oxford he played for Pegasus in the final of the 1950–51 FA Amateur Cup against Bishop Auckland at Wembley, which Pegasus won 2–1. He signed for Northampton Town in August 1950, making ten appearances for the club. Potts also played for the England amateur team, gaining eight caps.

Potts died in the Narrabeen suburb of Sydney on 23 April 2011, at the age of 86.

References

External links

1925 births
2011 deaths
Footballers from Carlisle, Cumbria
Cricketers from Cumbria
People educated at Stand Grammar School
Alumni of Keble College, Oxford
English cricketers
Oxford University cricketers
English footballers
Association football wingers
Oxford University A.F.C. players
Pegasus A.F.C. players
Northampton Town F.C. players
England amateur international footballers
English emigrants to Australia